Jevons may refer to:

People
 Frank Byron Jevons (1858–1936), British academic and philosopher
 Frederic Jevons (born 1929), academic
 Marshall Jevons, the name of a fictitious crime writer invented and used by William Breit and Kenneth G. Elzinga
 Phil Jevons (born 1979), English football player
 William Stanley Jevons (1835–1882), English economist and logician

Other
 Jevons paradox - an economic paradox where increased efficiency sometimes causes increased resource consumption.

See also
 Jevon (disambiguation)
 Jevans
 Jeavons (disambiguation)